Totally is the eight studio album by German band Bad Boys Blue. It was released on 26 October 1992 by Coconut Records. Three singles were also released. John McInerney performed nine songs, and Andrew Thomas one. The record includes two international hits: "I Totally Miss You" and "Save Your Love". The album reached #83 in German charts.

Track listing
"Have You Ever Had a Love Like This" – 3:47   
"I Totally Miss You" – 3:59   
"What a Feeling" – 3:22   
"Who's That Man?" – 3:51   
"Warm and Tender Love" – 4:00
"Save Your Love" – 4:01   
"Johnny" – 4:29   
"I'm Never Gonna Fall in Love Again" – 3:43   
"Rhythm of the Night" – 3:56   
"I Totally Miss You (Re-Mix)" – 4:31

Personnel
Bad Boys Blue
John McInerney – lead vocal (1 2 3 4 6 7 8 9 10)
Andrew Thomas – lead vocal (5)
Trevor Bannister

Additional personnel
Lyrics By – J. McInerney (tracks: 7), K. van Haaren (tracks: 1 to 4, 6 to 10)
Music By – A. Strasser (tracks: 8), T. Hendrik (tracks: 1 to 4, 6 7 9 10) 
Photography By – Uwe Blum 
Producer – Tony Hendrik and Karin Hartmann

Credits
All tracks written by T. Hendrik and K. van Haaren except 5 written by B. Robinson and Irral I. Berger
7 written by T. Hendrik, K. van Haaren, and J. McInerney
8 written by A. Strasser and K. van Haaren.

References

External links
ALBUM - Totally
Bad Boys Blue – General Information

1992 albums
Bad Boys Blue albums